Ivo Emanuel Alves Oliveira (born 5 September 1996) is a Portuguese racing cyclist, who currently rides for UCI WorldTeam . He competed in the points race at the 2016 UCI Track Cycling World Championships. His twin brother, Rui Oliveira, is also an international track cyclist. In 2018, he became the first Portuguese rider to win a medal in the UCI Track Cycling World Championships. In October 2020, he was named in the startlist for the 2020 Vuelta a España.

Major results

Road
2014
 1st  Road race, National Junior Road Championships
2017
 1st Prologue Grand Prix Priessnitz spa
2018
 1st  Time trial, National Under-23 Road Championships
 1st Stage 3b Circuit des Ardennes
2020
 1st  Time trial, National Road Championships
2022
 2nd Time trial, National Road Championships

Grand Tour general classification results timeline

Track

2013
 National Junior Championships
1st  Individual pursuit
2nd Points race
 3rd  Points race, UCI Junior World Championships
2014
 UCI Junior World Championships
1st  Individual pursuit
3rd  Madison (with Rui Oliveira)
 European Junior Championships
1st  Individual pursuit
3rd  Omnium
 National Junior Championships
1st  Team pursuit
1st  Team sprint
1st  Omnium
2016
 National Championships
1st  Individual pursuit
1st  Kilometer
 European Under-23 Championships
2nd  Individual pursuit
3rd  Omnium
2017
 National Championships
1st  Individual pursuit
1st  Points race
1st  Omnium
 UCI World Cup, Minsk
2nd Individual pursuit
2nd Scratch
3rd Points race
3rd Madison (with Rui Oliveira)
 2nd  Individual pursuit, UEC European Championships
 2nd  Individual pursuit, European Under-23 Championships
2018
 National Championships
1st  Madison (with Rui Oliveira)
1st  Omnium
 2nd  Individual pursuit, UCI World Championships
 2nd  Individual pursuit, UEC European Championships
2019
 National Championships
1st  Individual pursuit
1st  Points race
1st  Omnium
2020
 UEC European Championships
1st  Individual pursuit
2nd Madison (with Rui Oliveira)
2022
 3rd  Individual pursuit, UCI World Championships

References

External links

1996 births
Living people
Portuguese male cyclists
Portuguese track cyclists
Sportspeople from Vila Nova de Gaia